The 498 Spanish Martyrs were victims of the Spanish Civil War beatified by the Roman Catholic Church in October 2007 by Pope Benedict XVI. They originated from many parts of Spain. Their ages ranged from 16 years to 78 years old. Although almost 500 persons, they are a small part of the Martyrs of the Spanish Civil War.

Background 
The Martyrs of the Spanish Civil War were clergy, religious and lay persons of the Roman Catholic church who were executed during the Spanish Civil War, in a period known as the Red Terror. It is estimated that in the course of the Red Terror 6,832 members of the Catholic clergy were killed. Some 2,000 of these have been proposed for canonization and have had their causes advanced to the Congregation for the Causes of Saints (CCS). Pope John Paul II was the first pope to beatify a large number of saints from the Spanish Civil War. About 500 Spanish martyrs were recognized by him in several beatifications since 1987. In this ceremony, Benedict XVI beatified 498 individuals, proposed in 23 separate causes, the largest group to be beatified so far.  In addition to these, another 1000 martyrs are awaiting conclusion of their causes in the Vatican.

Individual fates 
The 498 martyrs include bishops, priests, male and female religious and faithful of both sexes. Three were 16 years old and the oldest was 78.  They were from all parts of Spain, including the dioceses of Barcelona, Burgos, Madrid, Mérida, Oviedo, Seville, Toledo, Albacete, Cartagena, Ciudad Real, Cuenca, Gerona, Jaén, Málaga and Santander. Although Spain was the site of their martyrdom and the homeland of many of them, there were also some who came from other nations, from France, Mexico and Cuba. They are described as "men and women who were faithful to their obligations", and "who were able to forgive their killers". Cruz Laplana Laguna, the bishop of Cuenca, wrote I cannot go, only here is my responsibility, whatever may happen, while Fr. Tirso de Jesús María, a companion of Eusebio Fernandez Arenillas, wrote in the letter sent to his family on the eve of his execution: "Pardon them and bless them and amen to everything, just as I love them and pardon them and bless them".

Beatification ceremony 
The beatification of the 498 martyrs (list below) took place on Saint Peter's Square not in the Basilica itself, which can include only 60,000 persons. Cardinal José Saraiva Martins,  who gave the sermon during the beatification ceremonies, stated that these Martyrs all loved Christ and the Church more than their own life. The Cardinal pointed out that the victims of terror forgave their killers, referring to Father Tirso as an example.

The logo of the beatification, because of the very large number of new Blesseds, had as its central theme a red cross, the symbol of love taken to the point of shedding blood for Christ.

The Cardinal explained the difference between  "Martyrs of Spain" and "Spanish Martyrs". Spain was the site of their martyrdom and the homeland of many of them, but there were also some who came from other nations, such as France, Mexico and Cuba.  Catholic martyrs are not the exclusive patrimony of a single diocese or nation. Rather, because of their special participation in the Cross of Christ, they belong to the whole world, to the universal Church.

Pope Benedict XVI stated that faith helps to purify reason so that it may succeed in perceiving the truth. The Cardinal invoked the intercession of the Martyrs beatified and of Mary, Queen of Martyrs, "so that we may follow their example".

Spanish reactions 
Juan Antonio Martínez Camino, the secretary-general of the Spanish bishops, replied to criticism that the martyrs were old fashioned conservatives: the first martyrs of the Church died after they were labeled as traitors of the Roman Empire, and during the French Revolution, Catholic priests were defined as enemies of the revolution. The Spanish victims were branded as an obstacle to historical progress.

The Spanish bishops stated that Spanish society is threatened by militant Secularism. The 498 Martyrs were thus a reminder of other values:  "their beatification intends first of all to render glory to God for the faith which conquers the world". The bishops organized a national pilgrimage to Rome, the place of the beatification of the 498 Martyrs, and of the martyrdom of Saint Peter and Saint Paul.

The 498 Martyrs 
The 498 Martyrs were proposed in 23 separate causes; the Vatican lists them as:
 Lucas de San José Tristany Pujol, of the Discalced Brothers of the Virgin Mary of Mount Carmel;
 Leonardo José Aragonés Mateu, a religious of the Institute of the Brothers of the Christian Schools (the De La Salle brothers);
 Apolonia Lizárraga del Santísimo Sacramento, who was Superior of the Carmelites of Charity, with 61 brothers and sisters of the same orders;
 Bernardo Fábrega Julià, a Marist Brother;
 Víctor Chumillas Fernández, Priest of the order of Little Brothers and 21 members of the same order;
 Antero Mateo García, a lay person was head of family and third order of Saint Dominic. He was slain with 11 others from the second and third order of Saint Dominic;
 Cruz Laplana y Laguna, the Bishop of Cuenca;
 Fernando Españo Berdié, a Priest;
 Narciso de Esténaga Echevarría, Bishop of Ciudad Real, and ten companions;
 Liberio González Nombela, priest and twelve companions, all clerics of the Archdiocese of Toledo;
 Eusebio del Niño Jesús Fernández Arenillas, a religious priest of the Discalced Carmelites, and 15 companions;
 Félix Echevarría Gorostiaga, Priest, and six companions of his order;
 Teodosio Rafael, a priest of the Congregation of Christian Brothers  and three companions from the same order;
 Buenaventura García Paredes, a priest and Religious; Miguel Léibar Garay, Priest of the Company of Mary, and forty members of that order;
 Simón Reynés Solivellas and 5 companions, from the missionaries of the Sacred Heart of Jesus and Mary and from the congregation of Franciscan sisters;
 Celestino José Alonso Villar and 9 companions of his order;
 Ángel María Prat Hostench and 16 companions of the Carmelite order;
 Enrique Sáiz Aparicio and 62 companions of his Salesian order;
 Mariano de San José Altolaguirre y Altolaguirre and 9 companions of the order of the Most Holy Trinity;
 Eufrasio del Niño Jesús Barredo Fernández, Priest of the Carmelite order;
 Laurentino Alonso Fuente, Virgilio Lacunza Unzu and 44 companions of the Institute of Marist Brothers;
 Enrique Izquierdo Palacios, Priest and 13 companions of the order of Hermanos Predicadores;
 Ovidio Bertrán Anucibay Letona and 5 companions from the Institute of Christian Brothers;
 José María Cánovas Martínez, a diocesan priest;
 María del Carmen and Rosa y Magdalena Fradera Ferragutcasas, Sisters of the Congregation Hijas del Santísimo e Inmaculado Corazón de María;
 Avelino Rodríguez Alonso, Priest, order of the Augustins and 97 companions from the same order, together with Six Diocesan priests;
 Manuela del Corazón de Jesús Arriola Uranga and 22 companions of the congregation Siervas Adoratrices del Santísimo Sacramento y de la Caridad.

Controversy 
A number of controversies arose around the beatification of some of these clerics. The move was criticised by some because it recognized victims from only one side of the conflict. The Vatican said it was not about "resentment but... reconciliation".

One of the most notable of these is Cruz la Plana y Laguna, Bishop of Cuenca, a well-known supporter of the monarchic regime, who since the proclamation of the Second Republic had carried out a number of notorious political, pro right-wing campaigns throughout the province and had established close contacts with military officials such as general Joaquín Fanjul, who would lead the Madrid military uprising on 18 July 1936 in support of Franco's coup. The bishop of Cuenca is described by his biographer as "supreme advisor" to the general, as well as being closely involved with the fascist political party Falange. In 1936 he personally endorsed José Antonio Primo de Rivera, the leader of this party, as a candidate to the 1936 local elections. When the pro-coup uprising in Cuenca failed, the bishop was arrested by Republican militiamen for collaborationism. He was tried for conspiring against the Republican government and executed on 8 August.

The controversy surrounding the beatification of Augustinian friar Gabino Olaso Zabala, listed as a companion of Avelino Rodriguez Alonso, has been different. Friar Zabala was martyred during the civil war and was beatified. Attention was called to the fact that this priest had been formerly accused without conviction of carrying out acts of torture on Philippine friar Mariano Dacanay, in the days when friar Olaso was a missionary in the former Spanish colony during the time when the Katipunan was trying to wrest the islands from Spanish rule. The Roman Catholic Church proclaims that even sinners can repent and turn into saints, such as in the case of Augustine of Hippo.

Regarding the attitude of the Vatican, Manuel Montero, lecturer of the University of the Basque Country commented on 6 May 2007:

While much of Republican Spain was anti-clerical in sentiment, the Basque region, which also supported the Republic, was not; the clergy of the region stood against the Nationalist coup, and suffered accordingly. At least 16 Basque nationalist priests (among them the arch-priest of Mondragón) were killed by the Nationalists, and hundreds more were imprisoned or deported. This included several priests who tried to halt the killings. To date, the Vatican has failed to consider these clergy as martyrs of the Spanish Civil War, since they were not murdered in hatred of the Faith (odium fidei), a prerequisite for the recognition of martyrdom.

See also 
 Martyrs of the Spanish Civil War
 Saint Innocencio of Mary Immaculate
 The Martyrs of Daimiel
 Blessed Bartolome Blanco Marquez, cooperator of the Salesian Fathers

Notes

External links 
 A complete listing of the 498 Spanish Martyrs beatified by Pope Benedict XVI October 2007 
 Martyrs of Religious Persecution During the Spanish Civil War (first of sixty pages of martyrs with photos)
 The Persecution of Catholics in the Spanish Civil War
 From ZENIT news service article "A Martyr's Letter to His Girlfriend"
 Ariticle from Catholic News Service

References 
 .
 De la Cueva, Julio Religious Persecution, Anticlerical Tradition and Revolution: On Atrocities against the Clergy during the Spanish Civil War,  Journal of Contemporary History Vol XXXIII – 3, 1998
 Anastasio Granados,  El Cardinal Goma, Primado de Espana, Espasa Calpe Madrid.  1969
 Hubert Jedin, Konrad Repgen and John Dolan, History of the Church: The Church in the Twentieth Century   Burn& Oates London, New York (1981) 1999 Vol X (cit Jedin)
 Frances Lennon  Privilege, Persecution, and Prophecy. The Catholic Church in Spain 1875–1975. Oxford 1987
 .
 .
 .

Martyrs of the Spanish Civil War
20th-century venerated Christians
Spanish beatified people
Roman Catholic child blesseds
Executed children
Lists of Christian martyrs
Martyred groups
Martyred Roman Catholic priests
Red Terror (Spain)
Beatifications by Pope Benedict XVI